Edmund Keating Hyland (1780 – 1845) was an Irish uilleann piper of the early 19th century.

Biography
Keating Hyland was born in Cahir around 1780. At 15, he was blinded by smallpox. At 20, he studied music theory under John Andrew Stevenson in Dublin.

He composed the famous jig entitled "The Fox Chase" (based on an earlier eight-bar work, Maidrin Ruadh), and performed it before King George IV in 1821. The king awarded him new pipes worth fifty guineas.

He died in Dublin in 1845, aged 65.

Commemoration
A statue in bronze of Keating Hyland stands in Cahir's main square, sculpted by Mona Croome Carroll and paid for by Lady Margaret Butler-Charteris.

References

1780 births
1845 deaths
Irish uilleann pipers
People from Cahir
Blind musicians
19th-century Irish musicians
Musicians from County Tipperary
Irish folk musicians
Irish blind people